The Blasting Company, formerly known as the Petrojvic Blasting Company, is an American nouveau-folk band based in Los Angeles, California. The band was founded in 2008 by half-brothers Justin Rubenstein and J.R. Kaufman and the group has since expanded to include five members.

The band composed the soundtrack for the Cartoon Network mini-series Over the Garden Wall.

Style

The band's music is inspired by the music of Eastern Europe, particularly the music of the Balkans, and New Orleans dixie. The band has also been noted for its folk influences and Bohemian style.

The band uses a variety of more orthodox instruments including an accordion, as well as a Macedonian tapan.

Performances and projects

The band regularly performs in Los Angeles, and plays every Sunday at the Hollywood Farmers' Market.

The band wrote the soundtrack for the television miniseries Over the Garden Wall, for which it was critically acclaimed. The extended version of the soundtrack was debuted at the San Diego Comic Con in 2016.

Discography

Albums
 A History of Public Relations Dilemmae (2010)
 Over the Garden Wall (2016)

EPs
 Sketches of the Unknown (2020)
 Tiny Star (2020)
 For Hire (2022)

Singles
 Candy (2020)
 Old Summer Reckoning (2021)

References

Musical groups from Los Angeles